Haugsholmen Lighthouse is a coastal lighthouse located in the municipality of Sande in Møre og Romsdal county, Norway. It was established in 1876 and automated in 1979.

The light emits white, red or green light, depending on direction, occulting twice every 10 seconds. The red cylindrical tower with lantern and gallery is attached to one corner of a -story white keeper's house.

See also

 List of lighthouses in Norway
 Lighthouses in Norway

References

External links
 Norsk Fyrhistorisk Forening 
 Picture of Haugsholmen Lighthouse

Lighthouses completed in 1876
Lighthouses in Møre og Romsdal
Sande, Møre og Romsdal